Bombardier Services Site - Crofton is a traction maintenance depot located in Crofton, West Yorkshire, England. The depot is situated on the Wakefield Line and Pontefract Line at the eastern end of Crofton Junction and is located near the now demolished Crofton railway station.

History
The depot was opened in 2001 by Bombardier Transportation. The depot was upgraded in 2006 and has a 2-road shed and various external sidings with carriage washer and fuelling/CET point.  It was used for maintaining Class 170s for TransPennine Express. This has since ceased. The Depot is also a servicing facility for CrossCountry Trains Yorkshire operations (Leeds, Sheffield and York terminating trains) and Grand Central Yorkshire operations (Bradford terminating trains).  Hull Trains will once again start using the Depot for servicing their Class 180 when maintenance transfers from Old Oak Common Depot.

An additional siding was added to the depot in early/mid 2018 to increase depot stabling capacity resulting from timetable changes.

Allocation 
As of 2018, the depot does not have an allocation.  However, Class 220/1 Voyagers and Class 180 Adelantes visit the depot for servicing. Northern’s fleet of Class 170 Turbostars will be allocated here for all maintenance exam work. Currently, they are being overhauled here for Northern.

References

Sources

Railway depots in Yorkshire
Rail transport in West Yorkshire
TMD